The Horror of Frankenstein is a 1970 British horror film by Hammer Film Productions that is both a semi-parody and semi-remake of the 1957 film The Curse of Frankenstein, of Hammer's Frankenstein series. It was produced and directed by Jimmy Sangster, starring Ralph Bates, Kate O'Mara, Veronica Carlson and David Prowse as the monster. It was the only film in the Frankenstein series which did not star Peter Cushing. The original music score was composed by Malcolm Williamson.

Plot

Victor Frankenstein, a cold, arrogant and womanizing genius, is angry when his father forbids him to continue his anatomy experiments. He ruthlessly murders his father by sabotaging the old man's shotgun, consequently inheriting the title of Baron von Frankenstein and the family fortune. He uses the money to enter medical school in Vienna, but is forced to return home when he impregnates the daughter of the Dean.

Returning to his own castle, he sets up a laboratory and starts a series of experiments involving the revival of the dead. He eventually builds a composite body from human parts, which he then brings to life. The creature goes on a homicidal rampage until it is accidentally destroyed when a vat where it has been hidden is flooded with acid.

Cast

Production
The film was entirely financed by EMI. The film was originally going to be called “Frankenstein” then, when Sangster re-wrote the script, it was retitled “Horrors of Frankenstein”  before its final title.

Jimmy Sangster was initially asked to rewrite the script (which was originally brought to Hammer by actor/writer Jeremy Burnham). The project began as a straight remake of “Curse of Frankenstein”. Sangster declined until Hammer sweetened the deal by allowing him to re-write the script, produce and direct the project. Sangster rewrote the script as a black comedy. As Jonathan Rigby points out in the documentary “Gallows Humor” included with the Blu-ray that the opening opened with a credit sequence that made clear what Sangster’s intentions were; using what appears to be a felt tip pen (an anachronism) to mark off the body parts in a picture of a woman that would be needed for one of Frankenstein’s creations.

Budgeted at 200,000 pounds, Hammer sought independent financing and only had domestic distribution arranged at the time of production. This film was, along with “Scars of Dracula” (the other film that EMI financed also at 200,000 pounds) the first pair of films where Hammer had ever sought independent U.K. financing. The films played as a double bill. This was a very different approach whereas before Hammer had secured U.S. financing as well to insure that Hammer wasn’t at risk for the production costs. Shot over six weeks, the film recycled the sets from “Taste the Blood of Dracula” and “The Vampire Lovers” 

Ralph Bates was cast as Baron Frankenstein. The role was never offered to Peter Cushing, who had played the role many times previously for Hammer. This was part of an attempt to build Bates into a new star for Hammer. As Jonathan Rigby points out, Sangster wrote the role of Frankenstein as more of a psychopath rather than a sociopath as he had been portrayed previously by Sangster and other Hammer writers.

Credits
 Produced and directed by Jimmy Sangster
 Screenplay by Jeremy Burnham and Jimmy Sangster, based on the characters created by Mary Shelley
 Production manager: Tom Sachs
 Music by Malcolm Williamson
 Photography by Moray Grant
 Art direction: Scott MacGregor
 Edited by Chris Barnes
 Make-up by Tom Smith

Cast notes

Ralph Bates was cast as Victor Frankenstein, the role having, five times previously, been played by Peter Cushing. Soon afterwards, he appeared as Dr. Jekyll in the Hammer film Dr. Jekyll and Sister Hyde (1971), which co-starred Martine Beswick.

In the mid-1960s, David Prowse, later famous for his portrayal of Darth Vader in the first Star Wars trilogy, had actually gone into the Hammer offices to express his desire to portray one of their movie monsters, but was rather abruptly dismissed. As several years passed by and he went about building a larger body of work through various film roles, he was eventually approached by Jimmy Sangster about being cast as this revisionist Baron Frankenstein's laboratory creation. Prowse has the distinction of being the only actor to have portrayed Frankenstein's monster in more than one Hammer film: this production marked his first such appearance; the second occasion was Frankenstein and the Monster from Hell (1974), where his overall appearance was much more horrifically elaborate. He also appeared briefly in the traditional Frankenstein's monster make-up and costume in a gag appearance in Casino Royale (1967).

Reception
Howard Thompson of The New York Times enjoyed the first hour as "not only painless but also fun," comparing it favourably to Kind Hearts and Coronets. He disliked the final act when the monster emerged, "with awkward horror pitted against rather bland sheepishness. But it was good fun while it lasted. Hammer almost had something special." Variety wrote that the film "has an occasional lighthearted touch which adds much to its enjoyment," praising Bates for a "nicely suave and sardonic performance as the ingenious, self-assured son of Count Frankenstein." Kevin Thomas of the Los Angeles Times called it "a talky affair" and lamented that the new Frankenstein was a less sympathetic character than the one Peter Cushing played, as well as the monster being "simply a robot killer." The Monthly Film Bulletin declared: "This awkward and inordinately tedious attempt by Hammer to ring changes on the Frankenstein motif is liable to have even those who disliked the old formula wishing it had not been messed about. Jimmy Sangster may have supposed that in turning the Baron into a sexually voracious anti-hero with a macabre sense of humour he was bringing him into line with the Seventies, but in fact he only succeeds in annihilating all the power of the original myth and putting nothing in its place."

The film has a rating of 56% on Rotten Tomatoes based on 9 reviews, with an average score of 5.4 out of 10.

Releases on Home Video
The film was released in the U.S. on Blu-ray by Shout Factory on 20 August 2019 with a pair of commentary tracks, short documentary, a vintage interview with director Jimmy Sangster, a vintage interview with actress Veronica Carlson and a new interview with the film’s assistant director. The special features were rounded out with stills and the original theatrical trailer. The Blu-ray included the film in two aspect ratios 1.85:1 as it played in most theaters and 1.66:1. The U.K. Released the Blu-ray on 29 January 2018.

See also
 Frankenstein in popular culture
 List of films featuring Frankenstein's monster

Notes
 In 1986, Turner purchased pre-May 1986 MGM films, including Horror of Frankenstein for U.K, release, now owned by Warner Bros. through Turner Entertainment only in the U.K.

References

External links

 
 
 
Brian Trenchard-Smith at Horror of Frankenstein at Trailers from Hell

1970 films
British science fiction horror films
Films shot at EMI-Elstree Studios
1970s science fiction horror films
Hammer Film Productions horror films
1970 horror films
Remakes of British films
Horror film remakes
Frankenstein films
Films scored by Malcolm Williamson
Films set in castles
Films with screenplays by Jimmy Sangster
Patricide in fiction
Films directed by Jimmy Sangster
Films set in Europe
Films set in Vienna
Films produced by Jimmy Sangster
1970 directorial debut films
1970s English-language films
1970s British films